Wisin & Yandel is a Puerto Rican reggaeton duo from Cayey. They emerged in the music scene during the late 1990s and played an important role during reggaeton's rise into mainstream. The duo began an hiatus period in 2013 after fifteen years working together in order to follow their respective solo careers. During their active period, Wisin & Yandel explored different music genres, including reggaeton, hip hop, latin pop, electropop and contemporary R&B.

As to accolades as a duo, Wisin & Yandel received 47 awards from 163 nominations. Some highlighted accolades include a Grammy Award, 2 Latin Grammy Awards, 9 Billboard Latin Music Awards and 12 Lo Nuestro Awards.

American Society of Composers, Authors and Publishers Awards 
The ASCAP Awards are awarded annually by the American Society of Composers, Authors and Publishers in the United States since 1993. Wisin & Yandel have received one award.

Billboard Latin Music Awards 
The Billboard Latin Music Awards are awarded annually by Billboard magazine in the United States since 1994. Wisin & Yandel have received 10 awards from 45 nominations.

Grammy Awards 
The Grammy Awards are awarded annually by the National Academy of Recording Arts and Sciences (NARAS) in the United States since 1959. Wisin & Yandel have received one award from two nominations.

International Dance Music Awards 
The International Dance Music Awards are awarded annually during the Winter Music Conference (WMC) in the United States since 1986. Wisin & Yandel have received five nominations.

Latin Grammy Awards 
The Latin Grammy Awards are awarded annually by the Latin Academy of Recording Arts & Sciences in the United States since 2000. Wisin & Yandel have received two awards from eight nominations.

Lo Nuestro Awards 
The Lo Nuestro Awards are awarded annually by television network Univision in the United States since 1989. No nominations were given in 2018. Wisin & Yandel have received 13 awards from 32 nominations.

MTV Awards

MTV Video Music Awards 
The MTV Video Music Awards are awarded annually by cable television network MTV in the United States since 1984. Wisin & Yandel have received one award from four nominations.

Premios MTV Latinoamérica 
The Premios MTV Latinoamérica were awarded annually by cable television network MTV Networks Latin America from 2002 to 2009. Wisin & Yandel have received two awards from nine nominations.

Premios Juventud 
The Premios Juventud are awarded annually by the television network Univision in the United States. Wisin & Yandel received twelve awards from thirty-two nominations.

Orgullosamente Latino Awards 
The Orgullosamente Latino Awards were awarded annually by the music television channel Ritmoson Latino in Mexico. They were cancelled in 2010. Wisin & Yandel received one award from nine nominations.

People's Choice Reggaeton and Urban Awards 
The People's Choice Reggaeton and Urban Awards were awarded annually by the public of Puerto Rico. They were cancelled in 2008. Wisin & Yandel received one award from one nomination.

Premios Oye! 
The Premios Oye! are awarded annually by the Mexican National Music Academy in Mexico. Wisin & Yandel received no awards from two nominations.

|-
!scope="row" rowspan="2"|2009
|Themselves
|Best Pop Group
|
|-
|La Revolución
|Album of the Year
|
|}

Premios People en Español 
The People en Español Awards are awarded annually by People en Español magazine in the United States. Wisin & Yandel received no awards from two nominations.

|-
!scope="row"|2010
|Themselves
|Best Urban Soloist of Group
|
|-
!scope="row"|2012
|Themselves
|Best Duo or Group
|
|}

Premios Tu Mundo 
The Premios Tu Mundo are awarded annually by television network Telemundo in the United States since 2012. The ceremony was not held in 2018. Wisin & Yandel have received one award from three nominations.

Broadcast Music, Inc. Awards 
Broadcast Music, Inc. (BMI) annually hosts award shows that honor the songwriters, composers and music publishers of the year's most-performed songs in the BMI catalog. Wisin & Yandel received fourteen awards.

See also 
 List of awards and nominations received by Yandel
 Wisin
 Yandel

References 

Wisin